Hennings Pass is situated in the Mpumalanga province at Waterval Boven (South Africa).

Mountain passes of Mpumalanga